Vive la France is a 2013 French comedy film directed by Michaël Youn.

Plot 
Taboulistan is a tiny fictional country, supposedly wedged between Afghanistan, Kyrgyzstan and Tajikistan, virtually unknown to the world. Its only asset is a reputation for inventing tabbouleh. Alas, the Lebanese have stolen the recipe that their country is famous for. So, two half-brother Taboulistani shepherds are sent to France by their president to promote their country. Their method: "terrorist advertising". They seek to destroy the Eiffel Tower using a plane. Following a strike at Paris-Charles de Gaulle airport, they land in Corsica. They meet with Corsican nationalists and board a boat for Marseille. Unfortunately, one of them is the victim of an attack because he was wearing a PSG shirt, followed by a medical error. Unaware of their true motives a journalist helps them to go to Paris in orer to correct the medical error. Enroute they meet many hospitable people and overcome obstacles filled with high jinks. Once in Paris neither of the brothers can go through with the plan, but unbeknownst to them the Tabouli government has sent a back up crew. Luckily the brothers recognize them and foil their plan, becoming international heroes in the process and ironically bringing fame to Taboulistan.

Cast 
 José García as Muzafar
 Michaël Youn as Ferouz
 Isabelle Funaro as Marianne Bouvier
 Ary Abittan as Jafaraz Ouèchemagül
 Moussa Maaskri as Adadat Ouèchmagül
 Vincent Moscato as Uncle Momo
 Guilaine Londez as Aunt Nanette
 Franck Gastambide as Kevin
 Jérôme Commandeur as The Cop
 Émilie Caen as The Hostess
 Jean-François Cayrey as Taxi Paris

References

External links 

2013 comedy films
2013 films
French comedy films
Films set in Corsica
2010s French films